The A863 road is one of the principal roads of the Isle of Skye in the Inner Hebrides off the west coast of mainland Scotland.

It connects the town of Dunvegan and the north west of the island with the A87 that then crosses the Skye Bridge for access to the mainland road system.

Settlements on or near the A863
North to South
Dunvegan – junction with the A850 road
Lonmore
Roskhill
Ose
Struan
Bracadale
Coillore
Drynoch
Sligachan– junction with the A87

References

External links

Roads in Scotland
Scenic routes in the United Kingdom
Isle of Skye